Galbertstown Lower is a townland in Fertiana civil parish in County Tipperary.

References

Townlands of County Tipperary